The 2000–01 Wichita Thunder season was the ninth season of the CHL franchise in Wichita, Kansas.

Regular season

Division standings

See also
2000–01 CHL season

Wichita Thunder seasons
Wich